Augusta of Great Britain (Augusta Frederica; 31 July 1737 – 23 March 1813) was a British princess, granddaughter of George II and the only elder sibling of George III. She was Duchess of Brunswick-Lüneburg and Princess of Brunswick-Wolfenbüttel by marriage to Charles William Ferdinand, Duke of Brunswick. Her daughter Caroline was the spouse of George IV.

Early life

Princess Augusta was born at St. James's Palace. As she was the first born child of Frederick, Prince of Wales and the first born grandchild of George II of Great Britain and Caroline of Ansbach, Augusta was second in line for the throne of Great Britain, which changed a year later in 1738, when her brother Prince George (later George III of Great Britain) was born.

Fifty days later, she was christened at St. James's Palace by the Archbishop of Canterbury. Her godparents were her paternal grandfather, the King (represented by his Lord Chamberlain, the Duke of Grafton), and her grandmothers, Queen Caroline and the Dowager Duchess of Saxe-Gotha (both represented by proxies).
Her third birthday was celebrated by the first public performance of "Rule, Britannia!" at Cliveden in Buckinghamshire.

Augusta was given a careful education. She was not described as a rare beauty, having a loose mouth and long face.

In 1761–62, a marriage was discussed between Augusta and her second cousin, Charles William Ferdinand, Duke of Brunswick-Wolfenbüttel. The negotiations were delayed because her mother disliked the House of Brunswick. This obstacle was overcome by a reason described by Horace Walpole: "Lady Augusta was lively, and much inclined to meddle in the private politics of the Court. As none of her [The [Dowager] Princess [of Wales]'s] children but the King, had, or had reason to have, much affection for their mother, she justly apprehended Lady Augusta instilling their disgust on to the Queen. She could not forbid her daughter's frequent visits at Buckingham House, but to prevent ill consequence of them, she often accompanied her thither. This, however, was an attendance and a constraint the Princess of Wales could not support. Her exceeding indolence, her more excessive love of privacy, and the subjection of being frequently with the Queen, whose higher rank was a never ceasing mortification, all concurred to make her resolve, at any rate, to deliver herself of her daughter. To obtain this end, the profusion of favours to the hated House of Brunswick was not though too much. The Hereditary Prince was prevailed to accept Lady Augusta's hand, with four-score thousand pounds, an annuity of £5,000 a year on Ireland, and three thousand a year on Hanover."

On 16 January 1764, Augusta married Charles William Ferdinand at the Chapel Royal of St James's Palace. The wedding was followed by a state dinner at Leicester House, congratulations from the Houses of Parliament, a ball given by the Queen, and an opera performance at Covent Garden. The couple departed from Harwich on the 26th.

Life in Brunswick

The Duchess never fully adapted to life in Brunswick. She always viewed Great Britain in very high regard all her life and disregarded anything "east of the Rhine". This attitude did not change with time, and twenty five years after her marriage, she was described as: "wholly English in her tastes, her principles and her manners, to the point that her almost cynical independence makes, with the etiquette of the German courts, the most singular contrast I know".

After her first pregnancy in 1764, she returned to Great Britain in the company of her husband to give birth to her second child. Whilst in England, it was noted that the couple was cheered on by crowds every time they showed themselves in public. This, reportedly, exposed them to suspicion at court. During their visit, her sister-in-law Queen Charlotte apparently refused them some honours at court, such as military salutes. This attracted negative publicity toward the hosting royal couple. During the negotiations thirty years later for the marriage of her daughter to the Prince of Wales, Augusta commented to the British negotiator, Lord Malmesbury, that Queen Charlotte disliked both her and her mother because of jealousy dating from the visit of 1764.  
     
Augusta saw the court of her mother-in-law as boring and dull, especially during the summer months when her husband was absent at camp. A summer retreat was built for her in the southern part of Braunschweig where she could spend time away from court, built by Carl Christoph Wilhelm Fleischer and called Schloss Richmond to remind her of England. In her retreat, Augusta amused herself spending her days eating heavy luncheons, gossiping and playing cards with her favourites, often receiving English guests.

Their marriage was arranged for dynastic purposes. However, Augusta thought Charles to be very handsome and was initially pleased with him. Shortly after the birth of her first daughter, she wrote: "No two people live better together than we do, and I would go through fire and water for him", and it was noted that she seemed to be unaware of his flirtations in London.

In 1771–72, Augusta visited England on her mother's invitation. On this occasion, she was involved in another conflict with her sister-in-law Queen Charlotte. She was not allowed to live at Carlton House or St. James Palace despite the fact that it was empty at the time, but was forced to live in a small house on Pall Mall. The queen disagreed with her about etiquette, and refused to let her see her brother the king alone. According to Mr. Walpole, the reason was jealousy on the part of the queen. She attended her mother's deathbed during her second visit to England, and upon her return to Brunswick, extended her period of mourning, which eventually led to her retirement from participation in court life.

When her sister, Queen Caroline Matilda of Denmark, was convicted of adultery and exiled near Brunswick in Celle, Augusta would regularly visit her for weeks on end, much to the disapproval of her husband and parents-in-law .

In 1777, Augusta announced to her husband that she would retire from court life to oversee the upbringing of their children and perform religious studies under the Bishop of Fürstenberg. The reason was her disapproval of the relationship between Charles and Louise Hertefeld whom he, in contrast to his previous mistress Maria Antonia Branconi, had installed as his official royal mistress at the Brunswick court.

In 1780, Charles succeeded his father as sovereign Duke of Brunswick, and Augusta thus became Duchess consort.

Of Augusta's four sons, the eldest three were born with handicaps. The Swedish Princess Hedwig Elizabeth Charlotte described her, as well as her family, at the time of a visit in August, 1799: Our cousin, the Duke, arrived immediately the next morning. As a noted military man he has won many victories, he is witty, literal and a pleasant acquaintance, but ceremonial beyond description. He is said to be quite strict, but a good father of the nation who attends to the needs of his people. After he left us, I visited the Dowager Duchess, the aunt of my consort. She is an agreeable, highly educated and well respected lady, but by now so old that she has almost lost her memory. From her I continued to the Duchess, sister to the King of England and a typical English woman. She looked very simple, like a vicar's wife, has I am sure many admirable qualities and are very respectable, but completely lacks manners. She makes the strangest questions without considering how difficult and unpleasant they can be. Both the Hereditary Princess as well as Princess Augusta — sister of the sovereign Duke — came to her while I was there. The former is delightful, mild, lovable, witty and clever, not a beauty but still very pretty. In addition, she is said to be admirably kind to her boring consort. The Princess Augusta is full of wit and energy and very amusing. [...]

The Duchess and the Princesses followed me to Richmond, the country villa of the Duchess a bit outside of town. It was small and pretty with a beautiful little park, all in an English style. As she had the residence constructed herself, it amuses her to show it to others. [...]

The sons of the Ducal couple are somewhat peculiar. The Hereditary Prince, chubby and fat, almost blind, strange and odd — if not to say an imbecile — attempts to imitate his father but only makes himself artificial and unpleasant. He talks continually, does not know what he says and is in all aspects unbearable. He is accommodating but a poor thing, loves his consort to the point of worship and is completely governed by her. The other son, Prince Georg, is the most ridiculous person imaginable, and so silly that he can never be left alone but is always accompanied by a courtier. The third son is also described as an original. I never saw him, as he served with his regiment. The fourth one is the only normal one, but also torments his parents by his immoral behavior.

Later life

In 1806, when Prussia declared war on France, her husband, the Prince of Brunswick-Wolfenbuttel, 71 at the time, was appointed commander-in-chief of the Prussian army. On 14 October of that year, at the Battle of Jena, Napoleon defeated the Prussian army;  and on the same day, at the Battle of Auerstadt, the Prince was seriously wounded, dying a few days later. Augusta, with the Hereditary Prince and Hereditary Princess, fled to Altona, where they were present at her dying spouse's side.   Because of the advancing French army, they were advised by the British ambassador to flee, and they left shortly before the death of the Prince.

They were invited to Sweden by the Hereditary Princess's brother-in-law King Gustav IV Adolf of Sweden. However, Augusta preferred to stay at the Duchy of Augustenborg, where her nephew-in-law was sovereign. She remained there with her niece, the Duchess of Augustenborg (daughter of her sister the late Queen Caroline Mathilde of Denmark), until her brother George III of the United Kingdom finally relented in September 1807, and allowed Augusta to come to London. There she resided at Montagu House, at Blackheath in Greenwich, with her daughter, the Princess of Wales, but soon Augusta fell out with her, and purchased the house next door, Brunswick House. Augusta lived out her days there and died in 1813 aged 75. She was buried in the Royal Vault at St George's Chapel, Windsor Castle.

Arms
Augusta was granted use of the arms of the kingdom, differenced by a label argent of five points, the centre bearing a cross gules, the other points each bearing a rose gules.

Ancestors

Issue
Together the couple had 7 children:

Sources
 Beckett, William A.: Universal Biography. London: Isaac, 1836.
 Kwan, Elisabeth E.; Röhrig, Anna E.: Frauen vom Hof der Welfen. Göttingen: MatrixMedia 2006, p. 115−126.

References

1737 births
1813 deaths
18th-century British people
19th-century British people
18th-century British women
19th-century British women
British princesses
House of Hanover
House of Brunswick-Bevern
People from Westminster
Duchesses of Brunswick-Lüneburg
Duchesses of Brunswick-Wolfenbüttel
Burials at St George's Chapel, Windsor Castle
Children of Frederick, Prince of Wales